The Isle of Wight Council is a unitary authority covering the Isle of Wight, an island in the south of England. It is currently made up of 39 seats. Since the 2021 election, there has been an 'Alliance' coalition administration of Independents, the Green Party, Island Independent Network, and Our Island councillors, who together with the Liberal Democrat and Vectis Party councillors voted to elect Independent Lora Peacey-Wilcox as leader of the council, with the Labour councillor being absent.  The Conservative group is the principal opposition party, and the single councillors from Labour, the Liberal Democrats and the Vectis Party also sit outside the Alliance group.

History

On 1 April 1995 the Isle of Wight Council was formed, and became the first unitary authority in England. The new authority took control of district council functions, retaining the county council functions of the previous county council. The predecessor body to the Isle of Wight Council was the Isle of Wight County Council, which dated from January 1890.

Elections

Prior to 1998, the Liberals and then Liberal Democrats had dominated the council.  Between 1998 and 2005, it was under no overall control, ruled by a coalition of Lib Dems and Independents.

Elections held in June 2005 led to significant change as the Conservatives took over from the Liberal Democrats as the largest group, winning seats primarily from the Lib Dems and Independents who had previously worked together.

In the 2009 elections the Conservatives managed to retain their majority by securing 24 of the revised 40 seats; however this was the only Conservative council in the UK that lost seats.

In 2013, the Island Independents gained 20 seats, one short of a majority, with the Conservatives only winning 15. As of January 2015, the Island Independents have lost four councillors through defections, and the Conservatives one. Leader Ian Stephens stood down in January 2015, the next day announcing he was to stand to be the local MP.  Jonathan Bacon, representing Bembridge, Brading and St. Helens, was elected unopposed as the new Leader. He stood down, along with deputy leader  Steve Stubbings, in January 2017 citing 'the unwillingness of government to lift a finger to help and the preference for too many elected members to act negatively rather than try to help.'

Following the resignations of the leader and deputy leader in January 2017, Conservative members assumed control of the administration, with Dave Stewart appointed as leader. A new ruling executive was formed, made up of five Conservatives, one UKIP member and three non-aligned members.

In 2021 the Conservatives lost their majority on the council, against the national trend for that party, and an 'Alliance' administration of independents and Greens took control, their leader elected as Leader of the council with support from the single councillors from the Liberal Democrats and Vectis Party.

Coat of arms

The Coat of arms of the Isle of Wight was first granted to the County Council in 1938. On its abolition in 1995, they transferred to the new Isle of Wight Council.

The shield shows an image of Carisbrooke Castle, which was the historic seat of many island governors. At the bottom is the island's motto "All this beauty is of God".

See also
List of electoral divisions in the Isle of Wight

Notes

References

External links 
 

Unitary authority councils of England
Local education authorities in England
Local authorities in the Isle of Wight
Billing authorities in England
Leader and cabinet executives
1995 establishments in England